Igor G. Ursov (January 20, 1927 – June 20, 2002) (Russian: Игорь  Урсов ) was a Soviet and Russian tuberculosis specialist and organizer of public health who achieved tuberculosis control breakthroughs in Russia.

Biography
Igor Grigorievich Ursov was born in 1927 to his parents Grigory Ivanovich Ursov and Natalia Petrovna Drobot. His father originated from a large Cossack family from southern Krasnodar, and had a degree as a glass production engineer. His mother also came from a large family; she worked with her husband on new glass plants.
After Igor Ursov graduated from a special Air Force high school with a gold medal, he unsuccessfully applied to the Moscow Aviation Institute. Then, he was accepted to Moscow Power Engineering Institute's Department of Radio. After one and a half years of study, he decided to work in the medical field. Therefore, he applied to Kuban Medical Institute and passed entrance exams. There, he studied with Sergei Grigorievich Drozdov. Later, Ursov transferred to the I.M. Sechenov First Moscow State Medical University and studied under the guidance of prominent teachers and professors of this university, such as academician Anatoly Ivanovich Abrikosov.

The doctoral student was forced to abandon the proposed full-time graduate studies and begin work on a program to administer tuberculosis specialists in the Zubrilovo village in Tamalinsky District of the Penza region. After working for two years, he was elected a deputy of the Soviet Council of District. In 1956 he became head of the Klin city healthcare department and chief doctor of the Klin tuberculosis dispensary, which operated under the Moscow regional tuberculosis hospital. Igor Ursov was awarded the title "Honorary Doctor of the RSFSR" for his work improving measures to prevent tuberculosis and significantly reduce the incidence of tuberculosis epidemic in Klin.

Since 1968, Ursov led the Novosibirsk Tuberculosis Research Institute, when the previous director, Professor Mikhail Svirezhev, was invited to work in Moscow. Professor Ursov established a scientific reporting system to be followed by each member of the Institute. Professor Ursov was transferred to the post of Novosibirsk State Medical Institute under the order of the USSR's Ministry of Health on 1 August 1980,

In 1989, Igor Ursov provided assistance in Ulaanbaatar Medical University, Mongolia. He was consequentially awarded with an honorary membership of the society phthisiologists of Mongolia.

Scientific work
In 1964 Ursov wrote his thesis for Candidate of Medical Sciences degree, entitled "Repeated x-ray screenings in Klin city and Klin territory of Moscow Region". In 1973 he obtained the Doctor of Medical Science, writing his thesis on the "organizational and epidemiological bases of the tuberculosis elimination.": he became a professor in 1978. In 1986, he was selected as a Corresponding Member of the USSR Academy of Medical Sciences. At the academy, he worked on many projects, such as the study of the relationship of tuberculosis in humans and farm animals in Siberia, the use of intravenous bactericidal anti-tuberculosis therapy, and the use of artificial pneumothorax and pneumoperitoneum to cure tuberculosis.

Ursov is the author of more than 210 published scientific articles with 10 monographs among them. He guided and prepared thirty candidates of medicine and eight Doctors of Medical Sciences. Ursov developed the traditional Russian tuberculosis school as the head of the Tuberculosis Department of Novosibirsk Medical University. Particularly, he trained the Siberian School phthisiologists, including  Yuri Nikolaevich Kurunov, Vladimir Aleksandrovich Krasnov, and Tatiana Anatolievna Kolpakova. For 12 years, he also worked as a member of the Scientific Committee of the International Union Against Tuberculosis and Lung Disease.

References

External links
 History of Novosibirsk TB Research Institute about Igor G.Ursov
 In Russian: Новосибирский государственный медицинский университет об И.Г. Урсове  - Novosibirsk State Medical University about Dr Igor G. Ursov
 In Russian: Медицинский Некрополь - И.Г. Урсов  - Medical Necropol - IgorG.Ursov
 In Russian: "Медицинская Газета" № 51 от 18 июля 2012 г. - "Meditsinskaya Gazeta" #51 from July 18, 2012

1927 births
2002 deaths
People from Novosibirsk
Corresponding Members of the USSR Academy of Medical Sciences
Corresponding Members of the Russian Academy of Medical Sciences
Soviet public health doctors
Russian public health doctors
20th-century Russian physicians
21st-century Russian physicians
Soviet pulmonologists